So Runs the World Away is the sixth full-length studio album by American singer-songwriter Josh Ritter. It was released on vinyl record on April 17, 2010, as a part of Record Store Day in the United States. The vinyl record came packaged with a CD version of the album as well. The official album release was April 23, 2010, in Ireland, and May 4, 2010, worldwide. Ritter said of the album that it "marks the beginning of a new period in [his] life," and that overall, "the songs are larger and more detailed, and feel to me as if they were painted in oil on large canvasses." Ritter got the title from a line in the third act of Shakespeare's Hamlet.

Release and reception

The record's release was met with high anticipation and covered by multiple news and media publications. Stephen King reported looking forward to the album. Irish music magazine Hot Press featured "Josh Ritter week" with free track downloads from the album, front cover picture, and interviews. Upon its release the album was met with very strong reviews. The Irish Independent called it "Ritter's most intriguing and rewarding album to date, it's easily his most diverse." Bob Boilen of NPR's All Songs Considered said of the album, "I've come to expect good records from him...but this one took my breath away."

Track listing
All songs written by Josh Ritter, except "Folk Bloodbath" written by Ritter based on a traditional song by Mississippi John Hurt.

 "Curtains" – 0:57
 "Change of Time" – 4:04
 "The Curse" – 5:03
 "Southern Pacifica" – 4:24
 "Rattling Locks" – 4:25
 "Folk Bloodbath" – 5:16
 "Lark" – 3:04
 "Lantern" – 5:15
 "The Remnant" – 3:56
 "See How Man Was Made" – 3:26
 "Another New World" – 7:34
 "Orbital" – 3:29
 "Long Shadows" – 2:20

Charts

Personnel

Musicians
 Josh Ritter – vocals and guitars, violin
 Zack Hickman – double bass, electric bass, electric guitar, acoustic guitar, hi-strung guitar, omnichord, vibraphone, organ, bass clarinet, percussion, euphonium
 Austin Nevins – electric guitar, acoustic guitar, baritone guitar, e-bow, lap steel, glockenspiel, banjo, mando guitar, baritone ukulele, percussion
 Liam Hurley – drums, percussion
 Sam Kassirer — electric piano, piano, organs, synthesizer, vibraphone, percussion, samples

Additional musicians
 Dawn Landes — backing vocals
 Allie Moss — backing vocals
 Jesse Neuman – trumpet, electronics
 Rob Jost — French horn
 Tony Barba — tenor saxophone, flute

Production
Produced by Sam Kassirer
Recorded at the Great North Sound Society, Parsonsfield, Maine, from August 2008 to October 2009
Mixed by Brandon Eggleston at Secret Society, Portland, Oregon
Engineered by Sam Kassirer, Brandon Eggleston and Dan Cardinal
Additional recording by Jim Smith at Saltlands Studio, Brooklyn, New York, and by Austin Nevins at Austin's Studio in Somerville, Massachusetts
Mastered by Jeff Lipton at Peerless Mastering

References

External links
Josh Ritter official website
Lyrics

Josh Ritter albums
2010 albums
Record Store Day releases